This is a list of properties and historic districts within the Downtown St. Louis and Downtown West, St. Louis areas of the city of St. Louis, Missouri that are listed on the National Register of Historic Places. The downtown area is defined by Cole Street to the north, the river front to the east, Chouteau Avenue to the south, and Jefferson Avenue to the west. Tucker Avenue divides Downtown to the east from Downtown West to the west.

For other listings in the city, see National Register of Historic Places listings in St. Louis north and west of downtown and National Register of Historic Places listings in St. Louis south and west of downtown. For listings in St. Louis County, outside the city limits of St. Louis, see National Register of Historic Places listings in St. Louis County, Missouri.

Current listings

|}

Former listings

|}

References

Downtown
St. Louis-related lists
Downtown St. Louis
Downtown West, St. Louis